Freehiking refers to naked hiking as well as a form of hiking in which the participants intentionally avoid trails and predetermined destinations. This can also be referred to as "wander hiking" or "bushwhacking".

Naked hiking 

The term freehiking has been used by naturists for decades to describe the activity of naked hiking. It was adopted by hikers after the sport of freeskiing gained popularity in the 1990s.

Off-trail hiking
For off-trail hiking, the freehiker relies on tools such as topographical maps, a compass and a GPS unit.  It emphasizes a hike experience free of constraints, as opposed to seeking a shortcut to a specific destination such as a scenic viewpoints or summits.

There is some concern that freehikers cause trailbraiding (creating multiple paths which can damage vegetation), erosion, new trail creation, and other negative environmental impacts.  The freehiking community claims that the sport is limited to open, unrestricted public areas where off-trail hiking is permitted.

References

External links
 Hiking Naked Website

Hiking